This is a list of notable scientists born in Scotland or associated with Scotland, as part of the List of Scots series.
 

 
Scientists
Scottish scientists
Scottish scientists
Scientists, Scottish